Perry Lake or Perry Lakes may refer to several lakes:

Australia
Perry Lakes Reserve, a nature reserve in Australia

Canada
Perry Lake (Nova Scotia), a lake in Nova Scotia
 Perry Lake (Kearney, Ontario), a lake in Ontario

United States
Perry Lake (Kansas), a reservoir in Kansas
Perry Lake Township, Minnesota
Perry Lake (Minnesota), a lake in Minnesota